The United Nations Peacekeepers Medal is awarded to those members of the Irish Defence Forces or Chaplaincy Service who have served overseas on a United Nation Mission or United Nations Mandated Mission.

Criteria
The UN Peacekeepers Medal was introduced in 1989. Members, both current and former, of the Defence Forces or Chaplaincy Service who have served with a United Nations peacekeeping mission and have earned a United Nations Medal are eligible for award of this Irish Defence Force honour. The UN Peacekeepers Medal may only be awarded once to an individual. The period of qualifying service is waived for those members who are killed or presumed killed while serving overseas. In those cases the medal is awarded posthumously and presented to the next of kin.

Appearance
The medal is round and made of white metal. The obverse of the medal depicts Éire, a national personification of Ireland, standing along a shoreline while releasing a dove over the sea. The dove carries an olive branch in its beak. Farther out, on the horizon is a flock of wilde geese in flight. The reverse bears the legend UNITED NATIONS FOR PEACE, at the top in Irish and below in English. The medal is attached to the ribbon by a straight unswiveled bar.

The ribbon is composed of a central orange stripe  bisected by  a  stripe of United Nations blue.

References

Military of the Republic of Ireland
Orders, decorations, and medals of Ireland
Awards established in 1989